Patrick French (5 March 1966 – 16 March 2023) was a British writer, historian and academician. He was educated at the University of Edinburgh, where he studied English and American literature, and received a PhD in South Asian Studies. He was appointed the inaugural Dean of the School of Arts and Sciences at Ahmedabad University in July 2017.

French was the author of several books including: Younghusband: the Last Great Imperial Adventurer (1994), a biography of Francis Younghusband; The World Is What It Is (2008), an authorised biography of Nobel Laureate V. S. Naipaul that won the National Book Critics Circle Award in the United States of America; and India: A Portrait (2011).

During the 1992 general election, French was a Green Party candidate for Parliament. He sat on the executive committee of Free Tibet, a Tibet Support Group UK, and was a founding member of the inter-governmental India-UK Round Table.

Life and career
French was born on 5 March 1966. At the age of 25, French set off on a trail across Central Asia to retrace the steps of British explorer Francis Younghusband. This resulted in the publication of his first book, Younghusband: The Last Great Imperial Adventurer in 1994. The book went on to win both the Somerset Maugham Award and the Royal Society of Literature's W. H. Heinemann Prize.

French's next book, Liberty or Death: India's Journey to Independence and Division, was published in 1997 and earned the author accolades and brickbats in equal parts. It was described by some in the Indian media as presenting a "revisionist view" of Mahatma Gandhi and Mohammad Ali Jinnah's role in the Indian Independence movement, and there were a few calls to ban the book in India. On the other hand, Philip Ziegler hailed it as "a remarkable achievement," and Khushwant Singh described the author as "a first rate historian and storyteller." The book sold heavily due to the controversy and French was awarded the Sunday Times Young Author of the Year award for the book.

Published in 2003, Tibet, Tibet: A Personal History of a Lost Land was French’s third book. According to the author’s own account, his interest in Tibet was triggered by a meeting he had with the Dalai Lama when he was 16, but the book emerged from "a gradual nervousness that the western idea of Tibet, particularly the views of Tibet campaigners, was becoming too detached from the reality of what Tibet was like. So I did a long journey through Tibet in 1999." The Independent described the book as "intelligent as well as passionate in its approach". Pico Iyer in The Los Angeles Times book review described French as a "scrupulous and disciplined writer" who "has a decided gift for inspired and heartfelt research and a knack for coming upon overlooked details that are worth several volumes of analysis".

The World Is What It Is, French's authorised biography of the Nobel Prize–winning author V. S. Naipaul, was published in 2008. In the New York Review of Books Ian Buruma described French as the inventor of a new genre, "the confessional biography". The book was selected by the editors of The New York Times Book Review as one of the "10 Best books of 2008". In 2008 The World Is What It Is was awarded the National Book Critics Circle Award in America, and was also shortlisted for the Samuel Johnson Prize. French was also awarded the Hawthornden Prize in 2009 for the book.

In 2011, French published India: A Portrait, descrobed as "an intimate biography of 1.2 billion people". The book is a narrative of the social and economic revolutions that are transforming India. French also started an India-focused website called The India Site.

Before his death French was working on the authorised biography of another Nobel laureate, Doris Lessing.

Personal life and death
French was married to Meru Gokhale, formerly the Editor in Chief at Penguin Random House India, and the daughter of author and publisher Namita Gokhale. He was married once before.

In 2003, French was offered and declined the Order of the British Empire (OBE).

French died on 16 March 2023, at the age of 57. He had had cancer for four years.

Bibliography
Younghusband: The Last Great Imperial Adventurer (1994)
Liberty or Death: India’s Journey to Independence and Division (1997)
Tibet, Tibet: A Personal History of a Lost Land (2003)
The World Is What It Is (2008)
India: A Portrait (2011)

References

External links 
• Appearance on The Filter Podcast

1966 births
2023 deaths
20th-century biographers
20th-century English historians
20th-century English male writers
21st-century biographers
21st-century English writers
Alumni of the University of Edinburgh
English biographers
English male non-fiction writers
Tibet freedom activists